142nd meridian may refer to:

142nd meridian east, a line of longitude east of the Greenwich Meridian
142nd meridian west, a line of longitude west of the Greenwich Meridian